Raymond Kirsch (18 January 1942 - 11 March 2013) was a Luxembourgian businessman, economist, and administrator.  He was the chairman of the Luxembourg Stock Exchange, from 1 February 2004. to 20 April 2011.  Kirsch had previously sat as administrator of the Luxembourg Stock Exchange since 1990, and vice-chairman since 1993, and had also been the Director-General of the Banque et Caisse d'Épargne de l'État (1989 – 2004).

Kirsch was President of the Council of State for a single term, from 14 January 2000 to 13 January 2001.

Footnotes

Luxembourgian businesspeople
Luxembourgian economists
Luxembourgian bankers
Presidents of the Council of State of Luxembourg
Members of the Council of State of Luxembourg
Free University of Brussels (1834–1969) alumni
Sciences Po alumni
1943 births
2013 deaths
Governors of the Central Bank of Luxembourg